The 2021 Lima Challenger II was a professional tennis tournament played on clay courts. It was the sixteenth edition of the tournament which was part of the 2021 ATP Challenger Tour. It took place in Lima, Peru between 25 and 31 October 2021.

Singles main-draw entrants

Seeds

 1 Rankings are as of 18 October 2021.

Other entrants
The following players received wildcards into the singles main draw:
  Nicolás Álvarez
  Arklon Huertas del Pino
  Conner Huertas del Pino

The following player received entry into the singles main draw using a protected ranking:
  Gerald Melzer

The following players received entry into the singles main draw as alternates:
  Peđa Krstin
  Orlando Luz
  Nicolás Mejía
  Gonçalo Oliveira
  Roberto Quiroz

The following players received entry from the qualifying draw:
  Hernán Casanova
  Alexandar Lazarov
  Jaroslav Pospíšil
  Gonzalo Villanueva

The following players received entry as lucky losers:
  Alexis Galarneau
  Cristian Rodríguez
  Jean Thirouin

Champions

Singles

  Nicolás Jarry def.  Juan Manuel Cerúndolo 6–2, 7–5.

Doubles

  Sergio Galdós /  Gonçalo Oliveira def.  Marcelo Tomás Barrios Vera /  Alejandro Tabilo 6–2, 2–6, [10–5].

References

2021 ATP Challenger Tour
2021
October 2021 sports events in South America
2021 in Peruvian sport